Buguchu is a village in Kochkor District of Naryn Region of Kyrgyzstan. Its population was 1,097 in 2021.

References
 

Populated places in Naryn Region